LSG can refer to:
LSG (band), an R&B group
L.S.G., a Techno-Trance project by Oliver Lieb
LSG Sky Chefs, an airline catering company
Laparoscopic Sleeve Gastrectomy, a surgical weight-loss procedure
League of Saint George, a far right group
Loss of Strength Gradient, used in the context of military might; a theory that strength declines as distance increases
Louisiana State Guard, the state defense force of Louisiana
Virgo Supercluster, the Local Supercluster of galaxies
Landing Ship Gantry a US Navy World war 2 type ship